The Burundian Ambassador to the United States is the official representative of the Government of Burundi to the Government of the United States.

List of representatives

References 

 
United States
Burundi
Burundi–United States relations